Watertown is a city in, and the county seat of, Jefferson County, New York, United States. The city is bordered by the town of Watertown to the south, east, and west, and is served by the Watertown International Airport and the Watertown Daily Times newspaper. In the middle of Watertown lies the Public Square Historic District, which was built in 1805 and listed on the National Register of Historic Places (NRHP) in 1984. As of the 2020 United States Census, the city has 24,685 residents, making it the largest city in the North Country.

The area was first surveyed in 1796, and was settled in March 1800 due to the abundant hydropower the Black River provided. The city was designated as the county seat of Jefferson County when it was split off from Oneida County in 1805. Watertown was incorporated as a village in 1816, and became a city in 1869. By then, it was booming as an industrial center for Upstate New York. By the early 20th century the city was said to have more millionaires per capita than any other city in the nation. During the mid 1960s, Chicago attracted many of the younger residents from the area along with their businesses, leading to the demolition of many historic buildings and a steady decline in population. By 2000, the city had lost over 7,000 residents.

The city serves as the commercial and financial center for the North Country. Located  from the Canadian border, shopping by Canadian visitors is important to Watertown's economy. The city also receives numerous tourists and summer residents. Watertown, South Dakota, was named in the city's honor.

History

Etymology 
Watertown got its name from straddling the Black River. It is unknown which settler chose it, but it is commonly believed to have been a consensus choice in order to attract mills. By 1850, mills manufacturing different products, powered by the Black river, were being built throughout Watertown.

Precolonial and colonial eras 

In 1791, New York City resident Alexander Macomb purchased the land of Jefferson, Lewis, St. Lawrence and Oswego county. He sent out multiple surveyors to sell the land to passing settlers. The area of Watertown was first surveyed in 1796 by Benjamin Wright, who was employed by Macomb to survey the northern and central portions of New York State. Wright made the following statement about the land after returning:
 
In 1798, pioneers Hart Massey, Henry Coffeen, and Zachariah Butterfield built cabins in what is now the Public Square area as part of a large migration into New York from New England after the Revolutionary War. The land was very uneven territory and was leveled out in one of the first landfill projects in the United States. The area was taken from the nearby town of Mexico in 1800.

Coffeen then moved his family into Watertown. Their vision was for an industrial center that would draw power from the river. In 1805, settlers cleared the center of town to create Public Square. During the 19th century, several significant buildings were built around it. Watertown was designated as the seat of Jefferson County after it was split from Oneida County. At that time, Watertown was one of the least populated places in the county.

Watertown was incorporated as a village in 1816. In 1869, it reincorporated as a city.

Due to its proximity to Lake Ontario, Watertown became a popular location for transporting supplies into Canada, which helped its economy. As industry and businesses flourished, successful residents built substantial retail buildings, churches, and private residences close to the square. After the Embargo Act of 1807 was passed which prohibited trade with Britain and France, which at the time included Canada. The economy suffered as a result and eventually led to smuggling materials into Canada, leading to the War of 1812. During the Civil War, the 35th New York Infantry Regiment began in Watertown.

The Paddock Arcade, built in 1850 according to European and US models, is the oldest continuously operating enclosed mall in the United States. It is also listed on the National Register, as are several mansions and churches, such as the Emma Flower Taylor Mansion and the Trinity Episcopal Church.

By the mid-19th century, entrepreneurs had built paper mills and major industries, including one to manufacture the first portable steam engine in 1847. In the late 1940s Watertown saw an influx in population from Irish migration into the area during the famine. In 1849 a fire began in the public square that destroyed most of the surrounding buildings. In 1851, the city was joined to Albany, Syracuse, and Rochester as well as other major cities of the state with the Rome, Watertown and Ogdensburg Railroad. Other mills were added to the business base, generating revenue to support the city's early public works projects, such as the water system and illuminating gas works in 1853, and a telephone system in 1879.

Watertown claims that Rodman native Frank W. Woolworth conceived the idea of his eponymous mercantile chain while working here in 1878. Woolworth, then employed as a clerk in Moore's Store, set up a successful clearance display of low-priced items. This led to his idea of a store specializing in fixed-price, cut-rate merchandise. Woolworth left Watertown and opened his first store in 1879 in Utica. Among the many manufacturing businesses was the Davis Sewing Machine Company, which originated in Watertown. It was the predecessor to George P. Huffman's Huffy Corporation, now a maker of bicycles and other sporting goods.

In the late 1890s, many new factories and industries were established, increasing the population by over 17,000 in the span of 30 years. The city gained a reputation for gambling and prostitution. Watertown also developed an educated professional class of doctors and lawyers. The economic center of the country kept moving west following the development of the frontier and a shift of population into the Midwest. In 1920, the city adopted a city manager-style of government.

After the Wall Street Crash of 1929, many stores shut down and laid off a considerable amount of their workforce, leading to economic hardships until World War II, when Watertown's industries switched from consumer products to war materiel, revitalizing the economy.

Contemporary history 
Little Trees were developed in Watertown in 1951; the Car-Freshner Corporation headquarters and manufacturing plant is located in the city. In the 1960s and 1970s, Watertown began a large de-industrialization which destroyed many historic buildings, such as the Hotel Woodruff and old courthouse. Watertown suffered economic and population declines. As Chicago boomed, it attracted many of the younger people from upstate New York for its business and professional opportunities. By the 1980s, unemployment in the area was up 20 percent.

In the 21st century, the city serves as a hub for a large rural area. In 2006, the city began a $7.4 million project that restored multiple buildings as well as fixing roads and walkways. The city completed this project in 2008, although more fixes are planned. In early 2019, Watertown was named "The Least Politically Prejudiced Place in America" by Amanda Ripley.

Geography 
Before the area was settled, all the land was rough and forested. Elevation was also a problem. The Black River, flowing westward through the city toward Lake Ontario, is a world-renowned kayaking destination. Competition-level kayaking events, such as the Blackwater Challenge, have been held on the river.

Climate 
Watertown has a humid continental climate or hemiboreal climate(Köppen: Dfb), with cold, snowy winters and an atypical autumn maximum precipitation regime, this being far more common in areas on the west coasts of landmasses. Unless otherwise noted, all figures cited below are from the GHCN station located closer to downtown.

Moreover, Watertown is located in plant hardiness zone 4b, which means that the temperature is likely to drop below  at least once a year.

Precipitation averages , and is distributed fairly uniformly throughout the year, with slightly more during autumn and slightly less during spring and late winter. Since Watertown is situated near the eastern edge of Lake Ontario, it receives much lake-effect snow, averaging  of snowfall in the winter.

Demographics 

As of the census of 2000, there were 26,705 people, 11,036 households, and 6,500 families living in the city. The racial makeup of the city was 89.13 percent White, 4.95 percent Black or African American, 0.54 percent Native American, 1.16 percent Asian, 0.11 percent Pacific Islander, 1.67 percent from other races, and 2.45 percent from two or more races. Hispanic or Latino people of any race were 3.59 percent of the population.

In 2009, the population was estimated at 27,489. There were 11,036 households, out of which 31.9 percent had residents under the age of 18 living with them, 40.7 percent were married couples living together, 14.2 percent had a female householder with no husband present, and 41.1 percent were non-families. 34.5 percent of all households were made up of individuals, and 13.8 percent had someone living alone who was 65 years of age or older. The average household size was 2.32 and the average family size was 2.99. In the city, the population was spread out, with 25.9 percent under the age of 18, 10.4 percent from 18 to 24, 29.6 percent from 25 to 44, 18.5 percent from 45 to 64, and 15.5 percent who were 65 years of age or older. The median age was 34 years. For every 100 females, there were 90.5 males. For every 100 females age 18 and over, there were 86.1 males.

The median income for a household in the city was $28,429, and the median income for a family was $36,115. Males had a median income of $31,068 versus $21,294 for females. The per capita income for the city was $16,354. About 14.4 percent of families and 19.3 percent of the population were below the poverty line, including 25.2 percent of those under age 18 and 11.8 percent of those aged 65 or over.

As of the 2010 US Census, there were 27,023 people living in the city. The racial makeup of the village was 86.25 percent White, 6.04 percent African American, 0.58 percent Native American, 1.83 percent Asian, 0.18 percent Pacific Islander, 1.33 percent from other races, and 3.79 percent from two or more races. Hispanic or Latino people of any race were 5.59 percent of the population.

As of the 2020 US Census, there were 24,685 people with 7.9 percent of residents being under the age of 5, 23.5 percent under 18, and 12.9 percent being over the age of 65, with 49.5 percent of residents being female and 50.5 percent being male. There were 10,867 households with 43.3 percent of the houses being made up of individuals. The population density was 2,996.0 per square mile (4821.5/km2). The racial makeup of the city was 83.8 percent White, 8.5 percent Black or African American, 1.0 percent Native American, 1.5 percent Asian, 7.8 percent Hispanic or Latino, 0.1 percent Pacific Islander, or 4.4 percent of two or more races.

Economy 
During the 2020 US Census the median price for owner-occupied housing units was $133,400, with the median income for a household being $40,253. In the 1980s, unemployment in the area was up 20 percent, and property values rapidly decreased. After Fort Drum was established, Watertown's industry shifted from industrial to consumer products.

Industry 
The city contains Factory Square,  of factories that were once powered by the Black River. In the 1880s and 1890s, many new factories were established, which began an economic boom. In 1900 3,760 workers were employed in the factories. Immediately adjacent to the factories and river was a prominent saloon district, which became a common location for scams, and the Watertown Daily Times often referenced workers being scammed by "tinhorn gamblers and short-card men".

In fall 2019, the city began a revitalization program for Sewall's Island and Factory Square in hopes of attracting new investments, businesses, and identifying transformational projects in the area. The city was awarded a Strategic Planning and Feasibility Studies grant from the New York Department of State to pay for the plan.

Arts and culture 
The Roswell P. Flower Memorial Library was built in 1904 as a memorial to Flower by his daughter, Emma Flower Taylor. The area also has a large Amish population.

Historic sites 

Watertown contains a number of historic buildings and districts. Buildings on the NRHP include the Paddock Mansion (added December 11, 1979), the Watertown Masonic Temple (added January 23, 1980), and the Emerson Place (added April 18, 2003), as well as several buildings inside the  Public Square Historic District (added September 7, 1984). The Jefferson County Courthouse Complex is an example of the substantial architecture of the city.

Sports 
The Duffy Fairgrounds is currently home to three sports teams. The Watertown Red & Black of the Gridiron Developmental Football League. The Red & Black are the oldest active semipro football team in the United States, founded in 1896. The Watertown Rapids of the Perfect Game Collegiate Baseball League have played here starting in 2017, following several professional teams. The Watertown Wolves have played at the municipal arena at the fairgrounds since 2012. They are a member of the Federal Prospects Hockey League and have won three titles, in 2015, 2018, and 2022.

After first hosting a minor league baseball team in the 1888 Eastern International League, Watertown and Duffy Fairgrounds hosted several others. The Watertown Bucks of the Can-Am League (1936), the Watertown Athletics of the Border League (1946-1951), the Watertown Pirates (1983-1988) and Watertown Indians of the New York-Penn League (1989-1998) played at the Duffy Fairgrounds. Watertown teams were an affiliate of the Boston Bees (1936), Pittsburgh Pirates (1983-1988) and Cleveland Indians (1989-1998).

Parks and Recreation 
The park was gifted to the city in 1916. The park contains Zoo New York, which began in 1920 when the Northern New York Trust Company donated two whitetail deer to Thompson Park and the City of Watertown. The following are also located inside the park:

 A half-acre of children's playground
 A stone pavilion building with benches
 Small stone stairways that serve as a hiking trail
 Hills that are often used as sledding areas
 The Watertown Golf Club
 Tennis courts
 Outdoor skating area
 Cross-country ski trails

Government 
The city's government was created after the village's incorporation in 1816. The act of incorporation provided for the election of five trustees, one for each ward. These extended to the formation of a fire department, the construction of water works and regulation of streets. In 1816, the first village election was held, at which Timothy Burr was chosen President. Sixteen years later, the village trustees were empowered by an act of the Legislature to borrow up to $2,000 ($ in modern dollars) to improve the fire department. In 1835 legislation authorized the construction of a market. In 1852, the boundaries of the village were extended and two wards added, making seven total. The officers consisted of a President, three Assessors, a Clerk, a Treasurer, a Collector and two police constables. Elections were held on the first Monday in March. Watertown is served by the Watertown Police Department and the Jefferson County Sheriff's Office.

Education
Watertown is served by the Watertown City School District. The elementary schools are North, Ohio, Knickerbocker, Sherman, and Starbuck. The higher-level schools are H.T. Wiley Intermediate School, Case Middle School, Watertown High School, Immaculate Heart Central Elementary, Intermediate, and Junior and Senior High Schools, the Catholic and secular educational institutions. There is also a Faith Fellowship Christian School. Jefferson Community College (JCC) is located in the northwestern part of the city and serves as the only institution of higher education within a  radius. It was started in 1961 and is part of the State University of New York (SUNY).

Media
The local newspaper, the Watertown Daily Times, is published seven days a week and serves Jefferson, St. Lawrence and Lewis counties. The Fort Drum Mountaineer is a weekly newspaper for Fort Drum soldiers and their dependents.

The Watertown market is served by four commercial television stations. The oldest is Carthage-licensed, CBS-affiliated WCNY-TV (channel 7), put on the air in 1954 by the publishers of the Watertown Daily Times. The station changed its call letters to WWNY-TV in 1965. After an unsuccessful struggle against the Federal Communications Commission and its directive for newspapers to divest themselves of television stations held within the same market, the Daily Times sold WWNY-TV to United Communications Corporation of Kenosha, Wisconsin, in 1981.

In 2001, United Communications entered into an agreement with Smith Broadcasting to operate a Fox network affiliate with low-power transmitters in Watertown and Massena. After a year of joint operation, UCC took complete ownership of WNYF-CD/WWNY-CD (channel 28). Both WWNY and WNYF were sold to Atlanta-based Gray Television in 2019.

Watertown is also served by PBS member stations WPBS-TV/WNPI-DT (channels 16/18), NBC affiliate WVNC-LD (channel 45), which also operates the area's MyNetworkTV affiliate on its LD2 subchannel, and ABC affiliate WWTI-TV (channel 50), which also operates the area's CW affiliate through The CW Plus.

Radio 
Watertown is served by a number of radio stations:

WATN 1240 AM News/Talk
WBDR 106.7 FM (Copenhagen) Top 40
WBLH 92.5 FM (Black River) Classic hits
WCIZ-FM 93.3 FM Classic hits
WFRY-FM 97.5 FM Country music
WJNY 90.9 FM Classical
WKWV 90.1 FM Christian Contemporary (K-Love)
WNER 1410 AM Sports
WOTT 94.1 FM (Calcium) Classic Rock
WRVJ 91.7 FM Public radio
WSLJ 88.9 FM Public radio
WTNY 790 AM Talk
WTOJ 103.1 FM (Carthage) Adult Contemporary
WWTJ-LP 96.9 FM Religious Teaching

Infrastructure 
The city is known partially because of its various late 19th century styles of architecture, including Eastlake as seen in the Paddock Mansion, Colonial Revival as seen in the Emerson Place and Queen Anne as seen in the Emma Flower Taylor Mansion.

Transportation 
Watertown was the nexus of the Rome, Watertown & Ogdensburg Railroad, which was later absorbed into the New York Central Railroad (NYC) network. Watertown sat at the junction of five different lines, as trains from Syracuse, Rome, Oswego, and Utica passed through Watertown on their way to points along the St. Lawrence River (principally, Ogdensburg and Massena) and to Canada. The Watertown passenger station, situated along the Black River behind Public Square at what is now J.B. Wise Place, was described as among the finest in the system. With the decline in travel by rail after World War II, however, the last named passenger train with a sleeper section to the town was the Iroquois in 1961; the train carrying sleepers south from Watertown was the Fifth Avenue / Cleveland Limited, also ending in 1961. Passenger service to Watertown finally ended in 1964. The station itself was demolished and replaced with a parking lot. Although the rail network is greatly attenuated compared to its peak in the early 20th century, CSX Transportation still transports freight by rail through Watertown.

Interstate 81 runs through the Watertown area. It is a north-south route that runs from near Dandridge, Tennessee north to Hill Island, Ontario, connecting via the Thousand Islands Bridge and a short connecting road to Highway 401 across the Canada–US border. Interstate 81 passes just to the west of the city of Watertown, near Salmon Run Mall. Access to the highway is from Exits 45 (Route 3), 46 (Route 12F), and 47 (Route 12).

U.S. Route 11 runs from eastern New Orleans, Louisiana, to its northern terminus at the Canada–United States border in Rouses Point, New York. U.S. Route 11 runs north-south through the city of Watertown.

Many state highways converge on the city. New York State Route 3 is an east-west route that begins in Sterling and heads north and east to Watertown. NY 3 interchanges with I-81 at the city line. NY 3 heads east into Watertown, overlapping with both US 11 and NY 12 through downtown prior to leaving the city to the northeast to head through the Adirondacks to Plattsburgh.

New York State Route 12 is a north-south route through the city, extending northward to Clayton then following the St. Lawrence Seaway to Morristown. A spur, NY 12E, takes a slightly-longer path through Cape Vincent before rejoining NY 12.

New York State Route 12F is a spur connecting NY 12 in downtown Watertown to New York State Route 180 near the Watertown International Airport in Dexter.

Adirondack Trailways serves both Syracuse, to the south, and Potsdam, to the east, on its U.S. Route 11 run. CitiBus also serves Watertown.

American Eagle has scheduled flights to and from Philadelphia.

Notable people

Historic 

During the late 19th century through the mid 20th century, Watertown became known for its extensive list of politicians born in or who studied in the city, notable examples include John Foster Dulles and Allen Dulles, who attended public schools in the city. The tallest building in the city, the Dulles State Office Building was named after Foster Dulles, and was built in 1970. Robert Lansing was born in Albany, New York in 1799 and moved to Watertown in 1817. Robert Lansing was born in Watertown and until 1907 he was a member of the law firm of Lansing & Lansing at Watertown and went on to become the 42nd United States Secretary of State. Joseph Mullin was born in Ireland and grew up in Watertown, and went on to be Member of the U.S. House of Representatives from New York's 19th district. Joseph Mullin was born in Watertown  and was a member of the New York State Senate from 1892 until his death in 1897. Roswell P. Flower was born in Theresa and became Deputy Postmaster of Watertown in 1853, becoming 30th Governor of New York from 1892 to 1894. The Roswell P. Flower Memorial Library was named after him. Frank Winfield Woolworth was born in Rodman, New York and attended a business college for two terms in Watertown, New York where he came up for the idea of a five-and-dime.

Contemporary 
Eric Anzalone was born in Dayton, Ohio, but grew up in Watertown, he was the leatherman of the group Village People from 1995 to 2017. Antonio Blakeney was born in Watertown and became a shooting guard for the Cleveland Charge. In May 2021, he was arrested for armed robbery but bonded out of jail. Bob McCreadie was born in Watertown and was a racer at the Watertown Speedway before its closure in 1975. Mary Gay Scanlon was born in Watertown and is a Member of the U.S. House of Representatives.

In popular culture
Watertown has appeared in multiple pieces of media over the years. Writer Fred Exley grew up in Watertown, and he set much of his 1968 novel A Fan's Notes in the city. Frank Sinatra's 1970 concept album Watertown explores the life of a middle-aged man in Watertown, whose wife has left him and his children. Harry Chapin made a famous quote: "I spent a week there one afternoon" about Watertown. His song "A Better Place to Be" was inspired by a story he heard in Watertown. Chapin mentioned both the quote and the origin of the song on his 1976 album Greatest Stories Live. Watertown was the given setting for the 1990 Bette Midler film Stella. While the movie was filmed in Ontario, several local items were taken there to be shown in the film, including the local daily newspaper, taxi-cabs, and shopping bags from the locally owned Empsall's department store. In the 2005 film Robots, the fictional town of Rivet Town was rumored to be based on Watertown, where director Chris Wedge lived during his teens. However, Wedge dismissed this in an interview.

References

Citations

External links 

 

	

1800 establishments in New York (state)
Watertown, New York
Cities in New York (state)
County seats in New York (state)
Cities in Jefferson County, New York
Populated places established in 1800